Marc Gicquel and Nicolas Mahut are the defending champions, but decided not to defend their title.

Seeds

Draw

References
 Main Draw

Ethias Trophy - Doubles
2015 Ethias Trophy